The 1987–88 season was Manchester United's 86th season in the Football League, and their 13th consecutive season in the top division of English football.

The season was a relative success, with the club finishing second in the league, but they did not play in the UEFA Cup the following season due to the ban on English clubs in Europe after the Heysel Stadium disaster. They finished nine points behind champions Liverpool, who lost just twice all season and for much of the campaign looked uncatchable. Perhaps the most memorable game of the season was in the league at Anfield just before Liverpool's title was confirmed, when United were 3–1 down at half time but fought back to hold the hosts to a 3–3 draw, denying them two points and delaying their bid to seal the title.

United lost just five times in the league in 40 games, and lost only once at Old Trafford, but a few disappointing draws against relatively unfancied sides including Charlton and Luton led to crucial points being dropped and prevented them from mounting a serious threat to Liverpool.

It was Alex Ferguson's first full season as United manager, and it was the first season at the club for new signings Brian McClair (who finished the season as one of the First Division's top scorers with 24 goals) and Viv Anderson. December also saw the arrival of defender Steve Bruce from Norwich City for £900,000, after an approach for Rangers and England defender Terry Butcher collapsed when the player suffered a broken leg.

After the season's end, Ferguson brought Mark Hughes back to Old Trafford from Barcelona in a £1.8 million deal that made him United's record signing. He also replaced Chris Turner in goal by paying £500,000 for Jim Leighton, who played under Ferguson at Aberdeen. He also attempted to sign Paul Gascoigne from Newcastle United, and a deal was agreed, but while Ferguson was on holiday, Gascoigne agreed to join Tottenham Hotspur in the first £2 million fee to be paid by a British club.

It was the last season at United for long-serving defender Kevin Moran, who was transferred to Sporting Gijon after losing his place in the team to Steve Bruce. Remi Moses played his last game for the club before ongoing injury problems forced his retirement from playing, when still in his twenties.

Pre-season and friendlies

Football League Centenary Tournament

First Division

FA Cup

League Cup

Events of the season
Manchester United began the 1987–88 season (the first full season under the management of Alex Ferguson) with new signings in the shape of defender Viv Anderson and striker Brian McClair, while Frank Stapleton and Terry Gibson were both on their way out of Old Trafford.

The First Division season began with Manchester United drawing 2–2 at Southampton, with Norman Whiteside scores both of United's goals, with Southampton's Danny Wallace scoring both of the home side's goals.

Bryan Robson was sent off on 29 August as Manchester United beat Charlton Athletic 3–1 away in their fourth league game of the season, placing them fifth in the First Division.

18 September 1987: Manchester United also made a bid to sign Wales striker Andy Jones from Port Vale, but the player instead opted for Charlton Athletic in a £300,000 deal. 

The good progress which saw Manchester United climb to mid table from near the foot of the First Division following Alex Ferguson's appointment last season continued into this season as they soon established themselves as a top five force and the nearest serious challengers to traditional title favourites Liverpool.

Alex Ferguson had long been known to be keen to secure the signing of Mark Hughes, who had to stay outside Britain until at least April 1988 to avoid taxation on money earned since his move from Manchester United to FC Barcelona in June 1986, was reported to be on the verge of signing a permanent contract with Bayern Munich of West Germany after a successful start to his loan spell at the Olympiastadion.

His hopes of signing the Rangers and England defender Terry Butcher were dashed when Rangers manager Graeme Souness offered him a lucrative contract to stay at Ibrox until at least 1993.

On a tour of Bermuda in late November, winger Clayton Blackmore was arrested on allegations of rape but swiftly released from custody after no charges were brought against him.

Alex Ferguson then made a £750,000 bid to bring Steve Bruce to Manchester United from Norwich City, but the offer was rejected. Ferguson had turned his attention back to Bruce following his failure to secure Terry Butcher, having originally been put off Bruce by Norwich's £1 million price tag. A second bid for Steve Bruce - reported to be in the region of £850,000 - was then made, but again rejected. The transfer was finally completed on 18 December at a cost of £900,000 transfer from Norwich City to Manchester United.

Ferguson then looked to boost his attack with an offer for Luton Town striker Mick Harford, but the player decided to remain at Kenilworth Road after manager Ray Harford offered him a four-year contract.

On 10 January 1988, Manchester United's FA Cup quest began with a 2–1 over Ipswich Town in the third round at Portman Road. 10 days later, their hopes of Football League Cup glory were ended by a 2–0 defeat at Oxford United in the quarter-final.

By the end of the month, however, they had progressed to the FA Cup fifth round with a 2–0 home win over Chelsea.

The FA Cup dream ended, however, on 20 February, when they suffered a 2–1 defeat at 
Arsenal in the fifth round. Brian McClair, the club's leading goalscorer, missed a late penalty that would have forced a replay.

Norman Whiteside, who had spent his whole seven-year playing career at Manchester United, handed in a transfer request near the end of March and spoke of his desire to play football in a foreign country.

On 4 April, Manchester United pulled off a remarkable 3–3 draw with Liverpool at Anfield in a First Division game which Liverpool had led 3–1 at half time. Manchester United trailed Liverpool, who have two games in hand, by 11 points as they still had five games left to play, so Liverpool inevitably clinched the title within three weeks of this game and United had to settle for second place.

On 18 April, Ferguson agreed a deal for Lee Sharpe, the 16-year-old Torquay United winger, for £200,000 - a record fee for a YTS player.

After the end of the season, Ferguson brought Mark Hughes back to Manchester United for a club record fee of £1.8 million and also signed Aberdeen and Scotland goalkeeper Jim Leighton for £500,000. Newcastle United midfielder Paul Gascoigne had looked set to join Manchester United, but then spurned them for a national record £2 million move to Tottenham Hotspur.

Squad statistics

References

1987-88
Manchester United